The Conspicuous Gallantry Cross (CGC) is a second level military decoration of the British Armed Forces. Created in 1993 and first awarded in 1995, it was instituted after a review of the British honours system to remove distinctions of rank in the awarding of gallantry decorations.  The Victoria Cross is the only higher combat gallantry award presented by the United Kingdom.

History
The CGC was instituted in the aftermath of the 1993 review of the honours system.  As part of the drive to remove distinctions of rank in awards for bravery, the CGC replaced both the Distinguished Conduct Medal (Army) and the Conspicuous Gallantry Medal (Naval and Air) as second level awards to other ranks and ratings.  The CGC also replaced the Distinguished Service Order (DSO), in its role as an award to officers for gallantry.  The DSO was retained as an award for outstanding leadership.  The CGC now serves as the second level award for gallantry for all ranks across the whole armed forces. It was designed and sculpted by Michael Rizzello, OBE (1926-2004) for the Royal Mint.

Eligibility
The CGC, which may be awarded posthumously, is awarded "in recognition of an act or acts of conspicuous gallantry during active operations against the enemy". All ranks of the Royal Navy, Royal Marines, British Army, and Royal Air Force may be awarded the CGC in recognition of qualifying acts of gallantry. Bars are awarded to the CGC in recognition of the performance of further acts of gallantry meriting the award. When the ribbon bar alone is worn, a silver rosette on the ribbon indicates the award of a bar. Recipients are entitled to the postnominal letters CGC.

Appearance

The medal is in the shape of a cross pattée in silver.  Arranged behind the cross, visible between the arms is a laurel wreath. On the obverse of the medal, the circular medallion in the centre depicts St Edward's crown. The reverse is plain which allows room for the engraving of the rank, name, and unit of its recipient. The award date is also engraved on the reverse of the medal. The medal is suspended by a white ribbon with two narrow dark blue stripes at the edge and one centre stripe in crimson.

Recipients
To date, there have been about 60 awards of the Conspicuous Gallantry Cross, including three posthumous and one unit award. No second award bars have been awarded.
The following is a full list of recipients who have been Gazetted to date.

See also
 Orders, decorations, and medals of the United Kingdom

Notes

References
 Mackay, J and Mussell, J (eds) – Medal Yearbook – 2007, (2006), Token Publishing, Honiton, Devon

1993 establishments in the United Kingdom
Awards established in 1993
Courage awards
Military awards and decorations of the United Kingdom